Peter Grace (March 18, 1845 – March 27, 1914) was an American soldier who fought in the American Civil War. Grace received his country's highest award for bravery during combat, the Medal of Honor. Jellison's medal was won for his heroism during the Battle of the Wilderness in Virginia on May 5, 1864. He was honored with the award on December 27, 1894.

Grace was born in Berkshire, Massachusetts, where he entered service. He is buried in the Arlington National Cemetery in Virginia.

Medal of Honor citation

See also
 List of American Civil War Medal of Honor recipients: G–L

References

External links
 Peter Grace at ArlingtonCemetery.net, an unofficial website 

1845 births
1914 deaths
American Civil War recipients of the Medal of Honor
Burials at Arlington National Cemetery
People from Berkshire County, Massachusetts
People of Massachusetts in the American Civil War
Union Army officers
United States Army Medal of Honor recipients